Saint-Victurnien is a commune in the Haute-Vienne department in the Nouvelle-Aquitaine region in west-central France. Its inhabitants are called Saint-Victurniauds.

The village is the only one between Saint-Junien and Aixe-sur-Vienne which extends over both banks of the river Vienne. It is located 10 km east of Saint-Junien and 20 km west of Limoges.

See also
Communes of the Haute-Vienne department

References

Communes of Haute-Vienne